Geograpsus is a genus of crabs in the family Grapsidae, containing four extant species, and one extinct species:
Geograpsus crinipes (Dana, 1851)
Geograpsus grayi (H. Milne-Edwards, 1853)
Geograpsus lividus (H. Milne-Edwards, 1837)
Geograpsus stormi De Man, 1895
† Geograpsus severnsi Paulay & Starmer, 2011

References

Grapsidae